Below is a list of notable artistic gymnastics events scheduled to be held in 2014, as well as the WAG medalists at each event.

Calendar of events

International medalists (WAG)

Major Competitions

International Competitions

Continental Championships

Multi-sport Games

World Cup Series

National Championships
Note: Although England, Scotland, and Wales are listed as individual countries in the table below, gymnasts from these countries compete under the flag of Great Britain in all international competitions except for the Commonwealth Games.

Season's best scores 
Note: Only senior gymnasts have been included below. The following have been limited to six-per-country for AA rankings and four-per-country for event rankings. In major international competitions such as the World Championships, countries are limited to only two athletes in each final. Finalists in the 2014 World Championships are highlighted in green.

Women's All-Around

Women's Vault

Women's Uneven Bars

Women's Balance Beam

Women's Floor Exercise

References 

Gymnastics by year
Artistic gymnastics